The  2011 AFF Women's Championship was held from 16 October to 25 October 2011, hosted by Laos. All games were played at the Laos National Stadium and New Laos National Stadium.

Thailand won the tournament for the first time after beating Myanmar 2–1 in the final.

Group stage 
All times are Indochina Time - UTC+7.

Group A

Group B

Knockout stage

Semi-finals

Third place match

Final

Awards

Goalscorers 
9 goals
 Nguyễn Thị Hòa

7 goals
 Souphavanh Phayvanh
 Nisa Romyen

5 goals
 Huỳnh Như

4 goals

 Sochitta Phonhalath
 Junpen Seesraum
 Nguyễn Thị Tuyết Dung
 Lê Thu Thanh Hương

3 goals

 Kanjana Sung-Ngoen
 Anootsara Maijarern
 Lê Thị Thương
 Phạm Hải Yến

2 goals

 Fatin Shahida Azmi
 My Nilar Htwe
 San San Maw
 Yee Yee Oo
 Naw Ar Lo Wer Phaw
 Khin Moe Wai
 Samantha Nierras
 Sunisa Srangthaisong
 Nguyễn Thị Liễu

1 goal

 Henny Hardiana Yigibalom
 Akudiana Tebai
 Lololy Bouakeo
 Manivanh Bounthan
 Soutdaoloung Phasiri
 Johnny Sayasanh
 Ting Sengmany
 Angela Kais
 Khin Marlar Tun
 Su Su Wai
 Kathleen Rodriguez
 Noor Fatin Afiqah
 Siti Liyana Yahya
 Pajaree Thaoto
 Taneekarn Dangda
 Warunee Phetwiset
 Chương Thị Kiều
 Nguyễn Thị Kim Tiến
 Lê Thị Thuy
 Nguyễn Thị Muôn

1 own goal
 Hamizah Abdul Talib (against Indonesia)

Final ranking

References

External links 
AFF Women's Championship 2011 at AFF official website
Tournament at soccerway.com

Women's
AFF Women's
2011
2011